The Jack Nicklaus Museum is a museum focused on and honoring championship golfer Jack Nicklaus. It is on the campus of the golfer's alma mater of Ohio State University in his hometown of Columbus, Ohio. 

The museum, opened in 2002, is a  facility offering a comprehensive view of Nicklaus' life and career in and out of golf as well as exhibits celebrating the history and legends of the game. In 2005, it was transferred by the private Jack Nicklaus Museum Inc. to Ohio State University.

It houses three theaters, a golf shop and a number of exhibit galleries.

See also
 British Golf Museum
 History of golf
 USGA Museum

References

Golf museums and halls of fame
Museums in Columbus, Ohio
Museums established in 2002
Sports museums in Ohio
Ohio State University
Jack Nicklaus
University District (Columbus, Ohio)